Eugen Șoriceanu Stadium is a multi-use stadium in Breaza. It is the home ground of Tricolorul Breaza. It holds 800 people.

In 2023 it was named after Eugen Șoriceanu, the founder of the first football club in Breaza, Tricolor I.

Football venues in Romania
Prahova County